Michaelchurch Escley is a village and civil parish  west of Hereford, in the county of Herefordshire, England. In 2011 the parish had a population of 198. The parish touches Craswall, Cusop, Dorstone, Llanveynoe, Longtown, Newton, Peterchurch and St. Margarets. Michaelchurch Escley shares a parish council with Newton, St Margarets, Turnastone and Vowchurch called "Vowchurch and District Group Parish Council".

Landmarks 
There are 66 listed buildings in Michaelchurch Escley. Michaelchurch Escley has a church called St Michael, a primary school, a pub called The Bridge Inn and a village hall called Escleyside Hall.

History 
The name "Michaelchurch Escley" means 'St. Michael's church' on the Escley Brook.

References

External links 

 

Villages in Herefordshire
Civil parishes in Herefordshire